Toby Thomas Knight (born May 3, 1955) is an American former professional basketball player. He played professionally for the New York Knicks.

Biography
Knight was born in Bronx, New York and graduated from Port Jefferson High School in Port Jefferson, New York.

A 6'9" forward from the University of Notre Dame, Knight was drafted as the 32nd overall pick in the 1977 NBA Draft by the New York Knicks. Knight played in the NBA as a member of the New York Knicks from 1977 to 1982. He averaged 12.9 points per game in his professional career. Knight was waived by the Knicks in 1983, ending his NBA career.

Knight was inducted into the Suffolk Sports Hall of Fame on Long Island in the Basketball Category with the Class of 1992.

References

External links
 Basketball-Reference.Com
 Knight Athletics

1955 births
Living people
African-American basketball players
American men's basketball players
Basketball players from New York City
New York Knicks draft picks
New York Knicks players
Notre Dame Fighting Irish men's basketball players
People from Port Jefferson, New York
Power forwards (basketball)
Sportspeople from the Bronx
21st-century African-American people
20th-century African-American sportspeople